Aslam Choudhary (born 1 January 1964) is an Indian politician and member of Samajwadi Party . He represented Dholana from seventeenth Legislative Assembly of Uttar Pradesh. 

He joined Samajwadi Party before 2022 Uttar Pradesh Legislative Assembly election.

References 

1968 births
Living people
Bahujan Samaj Party politicians from Uttar Pradesh
Uttar Pradesh politicians